Bystin is a protein that in humans is encoded by the BYSL gene.

Function 

Bystin is expressed as a 2-kb major transcript and a 3.6-kb minor transcript in SNG-M cells and in human trophoblastic teratocarcinoma HT-H cells. Protein binding assays determined that bystin binds directly to trophinin and tastin, and that binding is enhanced when cytokeratins 8 and 18 are present. Immunocytochemistry of HT-H cells showed that bystin colocalizes with trophinin, tastin, and the cytokeratins, suggesting that these molecules form a complex in trophectoderm cells at the time of implantation. Using immunohistochemistry it was determined that trophinin and bystin are found in the placenta from the sixth week of pregnancy. Both proteins were localized in the cytoplasm of the syncytiotrophoblast in the chorionic villi and in endometrial decidual cells at the uteroplacental interface. After week 10, the levels of trophinin, tastin, and bystin decreased and then disappeared from placental villi.

Interactions 

BYSL has been shown to interact with TROAP.

References

External links

Further reading